Brandon Achor (born 1988/1989) is an American politician. He is the member-elect for the 71st district of the Arkansas House of Representatives.

Life and career 
Achor lived in Maumelle, Arkansas. He attended the University of Arkansas and the University of Arkansas for Medical Sciences, where he earned his Doctor of Pharmacy degree in 2015.

In April 2022, Achor was a candidate for the 71st district of the Arkansas House of Representatives. He defeated his opponent Wes Booker in the Republican primary election. In November 2022, Achor defeated John Pack and Aaron Robert Raatz in the general election, winning 57 percent of the votes. He succeeded Joe Cloud. He assumes his office in 2023.

References 

1980s births
Living people
Place of birth missing (living people)
Republican Party members of the Arkansas House of Representatives
21st-century American politicians
University of Arkansas alumni
University of Arkansas for Medical Sciences alumni
Year of birth missing (living people)